Swimley is an unincorporated community in northern Clarke County, Virginia. Swimley lies near the border with Jefferson County, West Virginia on Swimley Road (Virginia Secondary Route 672). Swimley is located off of Crums Church Road.

Unincorporated communities in Clarke County, Virginia
Unincorporated communities in Virginia